Old Sachdeva railway stationwas a small railway station in Patna district, Bihar. Its code is OSH. It served Patna city. The station had a single platform. Due to low ridership, little to no revenue for Railways and congestion of areas through which the tracks ran, this route(and this station) have been closed and  property transferred to state government for building of an expressway.

References

External links 

 Official website of the Patna district

Railway stations in Patna
Railway stations in Patna district
Danapur railway division